Bart Got a Room is a 2008 comedy film written and directed by Brian Hecker, and stars Steven Kaplan, Alia Shawkat, William H. Macy, and Cheryl Hines. Also appearing in the film are Ashley Benson, Brandon Hardesty, Kate Micucci, Jennifer Tilly, Dinah Manoff (in her last film role as of 2022) and Chad Jamian Williams as Bart. The film premiered at the Tribeca Film Festival on April 25, 2008. It had a limited US release in select theaters on April 3, 2009 and was released on DVD on July 28, 2009.

Plot

The film chronicles nerdy high school senior Danny Stein and his unsuccessful attempts to secure a prom date while his divorced father and mother  are on their own unsuccessful quests to find love. The film's name comes from the fact that the most unpopular kid in school, Bart Beeber, not only secured a date for the prom, but got a hotel room after as well. This is a source of great anxiety for both Danny and his family.

Cast
 Ashley Benson as Alice
 Steven Kaplan as Danny Stein
 William H. Macy as Ernie
 Cheryl Hines as Beth Stein
 Alia Shawkat as Camille
 Brandon Hardesty as Craig
 Kate Micucci as Abby
 Jon Polito as Bob
 Jennifer Tilly as Melinda
 Katie McClellan as Gertie
 Dinah Manoff as Mrs Goodson
 Michael Mantell as Dr. Goodson
 Chad Jamian Williams as Bart Beeber
 Angelina Assereto as Marcie
Sam Azouz as Uncle Walter

Production
Filming took place in Hollywood, Florida. The film is a semi-autobiographical story inspired by Hecker's life growing up as a nerd in South Florida. Hollywood Hills High School was used for the shooting of some scenes in the film. This movie marked the first time that Alia Shawkat, Dinah Manoff, and Michael Mantell have worked together since their appearances on the 2001-2002 TV series State of Grace.

Reception
Bart Got a Room won "Best of Fest" awards at The Fort Lauderdale International Film Festival, The Asheville Film Festival, and The Chicago Gen Art Film Festival. Review aggregator Rotten Tomatoes has the film at a 70% approval rating, based on 37 reviews, with an average score of 6.2/10. The website's critical consensus reads, "Just enough sweetness and good performances lighten up the high school-set tensions, creating a family-appropriate teen comedy." Metacritic reported that the film has a score of 57 out of 100, based on 8 critics, indicating "mixed or average reviews".

Greg Quill of the Toronto Star called the film "an affectionately nuanced comedy of manners", praising its "warm sensibility" reminiscent of Woody Allen's Radio Days, "judicious editing and superbly controlled performances", concluding that: "Bart Got A Room avoids most of the clichés of the genre, it also avoids the predictable denouement. The off-the-kilter final act is a brave, heart-warming surprise." Betsy Sharkey of the Los Angeles Times felt that Hecker was ill-equipped when directing Macy and Hines, saying she felt the latter was "underused" in her role. She later wrote that he does a better job with Kaplan and Shawkat, finding the former "engaging" and doing "a good job with giving his character the naiveté and desperation of a kid hoping to change what seems to be the "loser" setting of his life." Jeannette Catsoulis of The New York Times wrote that despite Hecker capturing "knowing images" of Florida, she criticized his "antiquated" screenplay for lacking "freshness" in its given genre and giving his cast limited "caricature" parts, concluding that Tilly's five minute cameo reminds viewers that "comedy without risk is as barren as a prom without a theme." Susan G. Cole, writing for NOW, felt that Hecker made a mistake when taking the farcical path instead of the broad route when telling his teen comedy story with "unlikeable caricatures", saying, "[T]his indie pic demonstrates that a great setting, strong cast and decent premise won't save a bad script." John Semley of Exclaim! felt the film was another Napoleon Dynamite facsimile that bypasses "funniness in favour of stylized quirkiness" for its content, criticizing its thin awkward charm, "mean-spirited" and "adolescent" jokes, and portraying itself as "an ugly, ersatz colouring book version of real life." Ed Gonzalez of Slant Magazine criticized Hecker's "wafer-thin story" for being a "banal, half-sketched cartoon" filled with offensive humor and teen comedy clichés, concluding that Macy's portrayal of his character's "cornily scripted eccentricity" felt believable and he escapes "largely unscathed by sheer force of will."

Soundtrack
In the opening sequence, the film features the song "Sing Sing Sing", played by the Hollywood Hills High School Band at the Hollywood Beach Bandshell.

References

External links
 

2008 films
2008 comedy films
2008 directorial debut films
2008 independent films
2000s American films
2000s English-language films
2000s teen comedy films
American independent films
American teen comedy films
Films about Jews and Judaism
Films about proms
Jews and Judaism in Florida